The Bristol and Exeter Railway locomotives worked trains on the Bristol and Exeter Railway from 1 May 1849 until the railway was amalgamated with the Great Western Railway on 1 January 1876.

The Great Western Railway had leased the Bristol and Exeter Railway from its opening and provided the locomotives up until 1849.

The Bristol and Exeter Railway in turn provided the broad gauge locomotive power on most of the railways with which it had junctions:
 Bristol and Portishead Port and Pier Railway
 Somerset Central Railway
 West Somerset Railway and Minehead Railway
 Devon and Somerset Railway
 Exeter and Crediton Railway

Engineering
The railway established workshops at Bristol Temple Meads railway station in September 1854, the site later being known as Bath Road. Engine sheds were provided at major stations and on some branches including at Taunton railway station and Exeter St Davids railway station.

The engineer was Charles Hutton Gregory until May 1850, when James Pearson was appointed as Locomotive Engineer. He designed several classes of tank engines, including large 4-2-4T locomotives.

Locomotive types

Broad gauge
 1849 4-2-2 locomotives – 20 passenger locomotives
 1849 0-6-0 locomotives – 12 goods locomotives
 1849 Fairfield – a steam railmotor
 1851 2-2-2T locomotives – 7 small tank locomotives
 1854 4-2-4T locomotives – 8 locomotives with 9 feet wheels
 1855 4-4-0ST locomotives – 26 saddle tank locomotives
 1856 0-6-0 locomotives – 6 goods locomotives
 1859 4-2-4T replacements – 2 locomotives with 7 feet 6-inch wheels
 1866 0-6-0ST locomotives – 2 small tank locomotives
 1868 4-2-4T renewals – 4 locomotives with 8 feet 10-inch wheels
 1870 2-4-0 locomotives – 10 passenger locomotives
 1872 0-4-0T locomotives – 2 small well tank locomotives
 1872 0-6-0 locomotives – 14 Swindon Class goods locomotives purchased from the Great Western Railway
 1874 2-4-0 locomotives – 3 convertible passenger locomotives
 1874 no. 110 – a small tank engine, originally built for the South Wales Mineral Railway
 1874 0-6-0T no. 111

Standard gauge
The Bristol and Exeter Railway operated 28 standard gauge locomotives. Five of these spent a short while working as broad gauge locomotives.

Narrow gauge
The Bristol and Exeter Railway owned two locomotives – numbers 112 and 113 – for working the 3 feet gauge lines in its ballast quarry at Westerliegh, Devon.

Locomotives in numerical order
 1
 1849 Broad gauge 4-2-2
 1875 Standard gauge locomotive
 2
 1849 Broad gauge 4-2-2
 1872 Broad gauge 2-4-0
 3
 1849 Broad gauge 4-2-2
 1874 Standard gauge locomotive
 4
 1849 Broad gauge 4-2-2
 1871 Broad gauge 2-4-0
 5
 1849 Broad gauge 4-2-2
 1871 Broad gauge 2-4-0
 6
 1849 Broad gauge 4-2-2
 1870 Broad gauge 2-4-0
 7
 1849 Broad gauge 4-2-2
 8
 1849 Broad gauge 4-2-2
 1872 Broad gauge 2-4-0
 9
 1849 Broad gauge 4-2-2
 10
 1849 Broad gauge 4-2-2
 11
 1849 Broad gauge 4-2-2
 1874 Convertible 2-4-0
 12
 1849 Broad gauge 4-2-2
 1862 Broad gauge 7 feet 6-inch 4-2-4T
 13
 1849 Broad gauge 4-2-2
 14
 1849 Broad gauge 4-2-2
 1870 Broad gauge 2-4-0
 15
 1849 Broad gauge 4-2-2
 16
 1849 Broad gauge 4-2-2
 1875 Standard gauge locomotive
 17
 1849 Broad gauge 4-2-2
 18
 1849 Broad gauge 4-2-2
 19
 1849 Broad gauge 4-2-2
 20
 1849 Broad gauge 4-2-2
 1874 Convertible 2-4-0
 21
 1849 Broad gauge 0-6-0
 22
 1849 Broad gauge 0-6-0
 23
 1849 Broad gauge 0-6-0
 24
 1849 Broad gauge 0-6-0
 25
 1849 Broad gauge 0-6-0
 26
 1849 Broad gauge 0-6-0
 27
 1849 Broad gauge 0-6-0
 28
 1849 Broad gauge 0-6-0
 29
 1849 Fairfield
 1859 Broad gauge 7 feet 6-inch 4-2-4T
 30
 1851 Broad gauge 2-2-2T
 1876 Standard gauge locomotive
 31
 1851 Broad gauge 2-2-2T
 32
 1851 Broad gauge 2-2-2T
 33
 1851 Broad gauge 2-2-2T
 1876 Standard gauge locomotive
 34
 1851 Broad gauge 2-2-2T
 1875 Convertible 2-4-0
 35
 1853 Broad gauge 0-6-0
 36
 1853 Broad gauge 0-6-0
 37
 1853 Broad gauge 0-6-0
 38
 1853 Broad gauge 0-6-0
 39
 1853 Broad gauge 9 feet 4-2-4T
 1868 Broad gauge 8 feet 10-inch 4-2-4T
 40
 1853 Broad gauge 9 feet 4-2-4T
 1873 Broad gauge 8 feet 10-inch 4-2-4T
 41
 1853 Broad gauge 9 feet 4-2-4T
 1868 Broad gauge 8 feet 10-inch 4-2-4T
 42
 1854 Broad gauge 9 feet 4-2-4T
 1868 Broad gauge 8 feet 10-inch 4-2-4T
 43
 1854 Broad gauge 9 feet 4-2-4T
 1871 Broad gauge 2-4-0
 44
 1854 Broad gauge 9 feet 4-2-4T
 1870 Broad gauge 2-4-0
 45
 1854 Broad gauge 9 feet 4-2-4T
 1870 Broad gauge 2-4-0
 46
 1854 Broad gauge 9 feet 4-2-4T
 1870 Broad gauge 2-4-0
 47
 1855 Broad gauge 4-4-0ST
 48
 1855 Broad gauge 4-4-0ST
 49
 1855 Broad gauge 4-4-0ST
 50
 1855 Broad gauge 4-4-0ST
 51
 1855 Broad gauge 4-4-0ST
 52
 1855 Broad gauge 4-4-0ST
 53
 1856 Broad gauge 0-6-0
 54
 1856 Broad gauge 0-6-0
 55
 1856 Broad gauge 0-6-0
 56
 1856 Broad gauge 0-6-0
 57
 1859 Broad gauge 2-2-2T
 58
 1859 Broad gauge 2-2-2T
 59
 1860 Broad gauge 0-6-0
 60
 1860 Broad gauge 0-6-0
 61
 1862 Broad gauge 4-4-0ST
 62
 1862 Broad gauge 4-4-0ST
 63
 1862 Broad gauge 4-4-0ST
 64
 1862 Broad gauge 4-4-0ST
 65
 1867 Broad gauge 4-4-0ST
 66
 1867 Broad gauge 4-4-0ST
 67
 1867 Broad gauge 4-4-0ST
 68
 1867 Broad gauge 4-4-0ST
 69
 1867 Broad gauge 4-4-0ST
 70
 1867 Broad gauge 4-4-0ST
 71
 1867 Broad gauge 4-4-0ST
 72
 1867 Broad gauge 4-4-0ST
 73
 1867 Broad gauge 4-4-0ST
 74
 1867 Broad gauge 4-4-0ST
 75
 1866 Broad gauge 0-6-0ST
 76
 1866 Broad gauge 0-6-0ST
 77
 1867 Convertible 0-6-0 locomotive
 78
 1867 Convertible 0-6-0 locomotive
 79
 1867 Convertible 0-6-0 locomotive
 80
 1867 Convertible 0-6-0 locomotive
 81
 1867 Convertible 0-6-0 locomotive
 82
 1867 Convertible 0-6-0 locomotive
 83
 1868 Standard gauge 2-4-0 locomotive
 84
 1868 Standard gauge 2-4-0 locomotive
 85
 1873 Broad gauge 4-4-0ST
 86
 1873 Broad gauge 4-4-0ST
 87
 1873 Broad gauge 4-4-0ST
 88
 1873 Broad gauge 4-4-0ST
 89
 1873 Broad gauge 4-4-0ST
 90
 1873 Broad gauge 4-4-0ST
 91
 1872 Broad gauge 0-4-0T
 92
 1874 Broad gauge 0-4-0T
 93
 Standard gauge locomotive
 94
 Standard gauge locomotive
 95
 Standard gauge locomotive
 96
 1872 ex-GWR Swindon Class broad gauge 0-6-0 Shrewsbury
 97
 1872 ex-GWR Swindon Class broad gauge 0-6-0 Hereford
 98
 1873 ex-GWR Swindon Class broad gauge 0-6-0 Chester
 99
 1873 ex-GWR Swindon Class broad gauge 0-6-0 Windsor
 100
 1873 ex-GWR Swindon Class broad gauge 0-6-0 London
 101
 1873 ex-GWR Swindon Class broad gauge 0-6-0 Bristol
 102
 1873 ex-GWR Swindon Class broad gauge 0-6-0 Gloucester
 103
 1873 ex-GWR Swindon Class broad gauge 0-6-0 Birmingham
 104
 1874 ex-GWR Swindon Class broad gauge 0-6-0 Wolverhampton
 105
 1874 ex-GWR Swindon Class broad gauge 0-6-0 Bath
 106
 1874 ex-GWR Swindon Class broad gauge 0-6-0 Newport
 107
 1874 ex-GWR Swindon Class broad gauge 0-6-0 Reading
 108
 1874 ex-GWR Swindon Class broad gauge 0-6-0 Oxford
 109
 1874 ex-GWR Swindon Class broad gauge 0-6-0 Swindon
 110
 1874 ex-South Wales Mineral Railway broad gauge tank locomotive
 111
 1874 Broad gauge 0-6-0T
 112
 1874 3 feet gauge locomotive for Westerleigh Quarry
 113
 1874 3 feet gauge locomotive for Westerleigh Quarry
 114
 1874 Standard gauge 0-6-0T locomotive for the Culm Valley Light Railway
 115
 1875 Standard gauge 0-6-0T locomotive for the Culm Valley Light Railway
 116
 1875 Standard gauge 0-6-0 locomotive
 117
 1875 Standard gauge 0-6-0 locomotive
 118
 1875 Standard gauge 0-6-0 locomotive
 119
 1875 Standard gauge 0-6-0 locomotive
 120
 1875 Standard gauge 0-6-0 locomotive
 121
 1875 Standard gauge 0-6-0 locomotive
 122
 1875 Standard gauge 0-6-0 locomotive
 123
 1875 Standard gauge 0-6-0 locomotive
 124
 1875 Standard gauge 0-6-0 locomotive
 125
 1875 Standard gauge 0-6-0 locomotive

References
 

 

 
Great Western Railway locomotives
Bristol and Exeter